The 1994–95 Taça de Portugal was the 56th edition of the Portuguese football knockout tournament, organized by the Portuguese Football Federation (FPF). The 1994–95 Taça de Portugal began in September 1994. The final was played on 10 June 1995 at the Estádio Nacional.

Porto were the previous holders, having defeated Sporting CP 2–1 in a replay in the previous season's final. Sporting CP defeated Marítimo, 2–0 in the final to win their twelfth Taça de Portugal. As a result of Sporting CP winning the domestic cup competition, the Leões faced 1994–95 Primeira Divisão winners Porto in the 1995 Supertaça Cândido de Oliveira.

Fifth Round
Ties were played between the 22–23 December.

Sixth Round
Ties were played on the 15 February. Due to the odd number of teams involved at this stage of the competition, Sporting CP qualified for the quarter-finals due to having no opponent to face at this stage of the competition.

Quarter-finals
Ties were played on the 29 March, whilst replays were played on the 12 April.

Semi-finals
Ties were played on 9 May.

Final

References

Taça de Portugal seasons
Taca De Portugal, 1994-95
1994–95 domestic association football cups